Francisco Felipe Villanueva (October 10, 1867 – August 25, 1923) was a Filipino political leader during the Philippine–American War.

Biography
Villanueva was born in the then-town of Molo, Iloilo. He was the youngest of six children of Eusebio and Maria Felipe Villanueva. He studied law, receiving a Bachelor of Laws degree. Villanueva married Sofia Conlu and fathered 12 children.

Political career
Villanueva served as the Visayan delegate to the Malolos Congress, where he conferred with Gen. Emilio Aguinaldo and Apolinario Mabini to assure that the Visayas would be included in nascent First Philippine Republic. Villanueva subsequently served two terms as representative of the first district of Iloilo from 1909 to 1916, and as the one of the first senators (alongside Jose Altavas) of the seventh senatorial district comprising Iloilo, Capiz and Romblon from 1916 to 1919. He also served as Senate majority floor leader during the Fourth Legislature in 1916–1919.

Death
Villanueva suffered a fatal heart attack at his Senate office in the Legislative Building in Manila on August 25, 1923.

References

1867 births
People of the Philippine Revolution
People from Iloilo City
Nacionalista Party politicians
Members of the House of Representatives of the Philippines from Iloilo
Majority leaders of the Senate of the Philippines
Senators of the 4th Philippine Legislature
1923 deaths
Members of the Malolos Congress